Acrolophus variabilis is a moth of the family Acrolophidae. It was described by Walsingham in 1887. It is found in North America, including Arizona, California, Nevada, New Mexico, Oklahoma and Oregon.

The wingspan is 25–29 mm.

References

variabilis
Moths described in 1887